Patriarch Sergius I may refer to:

 Sergius of Tella, Syriac Orthodox Patriarch of Antioch in 544–546
 Sergius I of Constantinople, Ecumenical Patriarch in 610–638
 Sergius of Bulgaria, Patriarch of Bulgaria c. 931 – c. 940
 Patriarch Sergius of Moscow and All Russia, ruled in 1943–1944